Rahavard Farahani (born 10 July 1983), known professionally as Golshifteh Farahani, is an Iranian-French actress. She is known for her performances in M for Mother (2006), Body of Lies (2008), About Elly (2009), The Patience Stone (2012), Paterson (2016), Girls of the Sun (2018), and Extraction (2020). She was nominated for the Most Promising Actress Award for The Patience Stone at the 2014 César Awards.

Early life 

Farahani was born in Tehran, Iran. She is the daughter of Behzad Farahani, a theatre director and actor, and Fahimeh Rahim Nia. Her sister is actress Shaghayegh Farahani. Golshifteh began studying music and piano at the age of five, and later entered a music school in Tehran. At 14, she was cast as the lead in Dariush Mehrjui's The Pear Tree, a role for which she won the Crystal Roc for Best Actress from the International Section of the 16th Fajr International Film Festival in Tehran.

Career 
Farahani starred in the drama About Elly, which won Best Picture at the 2009 Tribeca Film Festival and a Silver Bear at the Berlin International Film Festival. Due to her appearance in the Hollywood movie Body of Lies, seen by Iranian authorities as a collaboration with American propaganda and a violation of Islamic law due to Farahani's appearance without hijab, she has not been allowed to return and work in Iran since 2009, and has since resided in France.
Farahani starred in The Patience Stone (2012), directed by Atiq Rahimi from his novel; it was favorably received by most reviewers. She also starred in a 2012 César Award video in the Most Promising Actors category.

In 2016, Farahani played Anna Karenina on stage in Paris and received laudatory reviews. She also played the lead role of Laura in director Jim Jarmusch's American feature film Paterson, opposite actor Adam Driver. The film received overwhelmingly positive reviews, scoring 96% approval on the movie site Rotten Tomatoes.

In 2017, she appeared in the fantasy film Pirates of the Caribbean: Dead Men Tell No Tales as the sea witch Shansa.

In 2020, she was in the action film Extraction as Nik Khan.

She was slated to appear in director Dariush Mehrjui's film Rumi's Kimia, which will be based on Saideh Ghods's novel Kimia Khatoon.

Non-film work 
Farahani is involved in environmental causes, and is an advocate for the eradication of tuberculosis in Iran.

In Iran, she was a member of Kooch Neshin (Nomads), a band that won the 2nd Tehran Avenue underground rock competition. Since leaving Iran, she has teamed up with another exiled Iranian musician, Mohsen Namjoo; their album Oy was released in October 2009.

In December 2014, she took 6th place in the annual Independent Critics Beauty List of 2014.

Since moving to Paris, she has worked with directors Roland Joffé, Huner Saleem and Marjane Satrapi, among others, and was a member of the international jury at the 63rd Locarno Film Festival.

Farahani, who has been exiled from Iran since 2008 for refusing to wear a hijab while acting in international films, has publicly supported the Mahsa Amini protests. On 28 October 2022, British rock band Coldplay invited Farahani to perform with them a cover of Shervin Hajipour's Baraye, which has been described as "the anthem" of the protests, at the band's concert at the River Plate Stadium in Buenos Aires. The concert was broadcast live to over 3,500 theatres worldwide in more than 70 countries as part of a two-night-only live-event cinema special during the Latin America leg of the band's Music of the Spheres World Tour.

Controversy 

After Farahani's appearance in the U.S. film Body of Lies, it was reported that Iranian government authorities had prevented her from leaving Iran. However, this was denied by her colleagues, and she appeared at the movie's American premiere. Her last film performance in Iran was in About Elly directed by Asghar Farhadi.

In January 2012, it was reported that Farahani would not be welcome in her native Iran after posing nude in the French magazine Madame Figaro. According to Britain's Daily Telegraph, Iranian government officials told her, "Iran does not need actors or artists like you. You may offer your artistic services somewhere else." A picture from the shoot on her Facebook page initiated a lively debate about her behavior. She also appeared topless in a short black-and-white film by Jean-Baptiste Mondino called Corps et Âmes (Bodies and Souls). She also posed for fully nude photographs taken by Paolo Roversi for an Égoïste cover and editorial.

Filmography

Film

Television

Music video

Theatre

Concerts

Awards and nominations

References

External links 

 

1983 births
Living people
Iranian pianists
People from Tehran
Actresses from Tehran
French film actresses
Iranian women singers
Iranian film actresses
Iranian stage actresses
20th-century French women
Iranian emigrants to France
20th-century Iranian actresses
21st-century Iranian actresses
Islamic Azad University alumni
French people of Iranian descent
Crystal Simorgh for Best Actress winners